Vitagonum is a genus of ground beetles in the family Carabidae. This genus has a single species, Vitagonum apterum. It is found in Fiji.

References

Platyninae